Wasilla Lake is a lake in Wasilla, Alaska, named by workers constructing the Alaska Railroad after a nearby creek named Wasilla Creek. The lake shore is the site of a city park, Newcomb Park. It is the northern terminus of the Seven-Mile Canoe Trail, the other end being at Finger Lake. Outside of the park areas most of the shoreline is private property. The lake has a stable population of rainbow trout and fishing is considered good for bank, boat, and ice fishing.

References

Lakes of Alaska
Wasilla, Alaska